The 2022 RAN Women’s 12s was the first edition of the 12-a-side rugby union tournament. It took place over two days on 15 and 16 July 2022 in Kingston, Jamaica at the University of the West Indies and included six teams. The format for 2022 changed from a rugby tens competition to a 12-a-side. The tournament is used as a development tool for the women’s game, with the aim of a Women’s 15-a-side international competition for the region. USA South Panthers won the tournament after beating, runners-up, Jamaica in the final.

Teams 
Teams are seeded based on the results of the 2019 RAN Women's 10s.

Format 
On Day 1, teams were divided into two pools of three according to their seeding, with a total of six matches played. Day 2 followed a similar format, with two pools of three based on the day 1 results followed by the finals.

Matches

Day 1

Pool A

Pool B

Day 2

Semi-finals

Finals

Championship final

Broadcaster 
Rugby Americas North announced that SportsMax TV would be broadcasting the competition.

References 

Women's rugby union competitions for national teams
Rugby union competitions in North America
Rugby union competitions in the Caribbean
Women's rugby union in North America
2022 in North American rugby union
2022 in American rugby union
RAN